Beaver River may refer to:

Rivers

Canada
Beaver River (Canada), in Alberta and Saskatchewan
Beaver River (Columbia River tributary), in British Columbia
Beaver River (Liard River tributary), in British Columbia and Yukon
Beaver River, or Holmes River, in British Columbia
Beaver River, or Sutherland River, in British Columbia
Beaver River (Grey County), in Ontario
Beaver River (Kapiskau River tributary), in Ontario
Beaver River (Lake Simcoe), in Ontario
Beaver River (Severn River tributary), in Ontario
Beaver River (Thunder Bay District),  in Ontario
Beaver River (Stewart River), in Yukon

United States
Beaver River (Lake Superior), in Minnesota
Beaver River (Cloquet River tributary), in Minnesota
Beaver River (Bear Island River tributary), in Minnesota
Beaver River (New York) 
Beaver River (Oklahoma) 
Beaver River (Pennsylvania) 
Beaver River (Rhode Island) 
Beaver River (Utah)

Places
Beaver River, Alberta, Canada
Rural Municipality of Beaver River No. 622, Saskatchewan, Canada
Beaver River, Nova Scotia, Canada
Beaver River, New York, U.S.
Beaver River (electoral district) (1987–1996), in Alberta, Canada
Beaver River (provincial electoral district) (1913–1952), in Alberta, Canada
Holmes River, British Columbia, Canada, formerly Beaver River

Maritime
 Beaver River (ship, 1942), see Boats of the Mackenzie River watershed

See also 

Beaver Creek (disambiguation)
Beaver Brook (disambiguation)